This is a sub-article to Białystok
Białystok, like other major cities in Poland, is a city county. The Legislative power in the city is vested in the unicameral Białystok City Council, which has 28 members. Council members are elected directly every four years, one of whom is the mayor, or President of Białystok. Like most legislative bodies, the City Council divides itself into committees which have the oversight of various functions of the city government. Bills passed by a simple majority are sent to the mayor, who may sign them into law. If the mayor vetoes a bill, the Council has 30 days to override the veto by a two-thirds majority vote. The current President of Białystok, elected for his first term in 2006, is Tadeusz Truskolaski.

It is also the seat of government for the Podlaskie Voivodeship. The city is represented by several members of both houses of the Polish Parliament (Sejm and Senat) from the Białystok constituency. Białystok is represented by the Podlaskie and Warmian-Masurian constituency of the European Parliament.

Governance
The last municipal elections were won by Civic Platform, which holds a majority of the seats in the City Council. The current city mayor, Tadeusz Truskolaski, won the elections as the Civic Platform's candidate, however, he has no official connection with the party. Platform's major opponents, Law and Justice, have a minority of the seats in the City Council and were running the city administration before 2006.

Former Presidents of Białystok include:
 Lech Rutkowski (1990–1994)
 Andrzej Lussa (1994–1995)
 Krzysztof Jurgiel (1995–1998)
 Ryszard Tur (1998–2006)

The responsibilities of Białystok’s president include drafting and implementing resolutions, enacting city bylaws, managing the city budget, employing city administrators, and preparing against floods and natural disasters. The president fulfills his duties with the help of the City Council, city managers and city inspectors.

In 2007 the city authorities established the Youth City Council, which is a self-governing body of adolescents living in Białystok and learning in secondary schools in the city. Youth Council is a non-political consultative body for local government bodies.

The city's official symbols include a coat of arms, a flag and a seal.

Intergovernmental Organizations
Białystok is a member of several organizations: 
 Union of Polish Metropolises
 Euroregion Niemen,
 Polish Green Lungs Foundation (headquarters)
 Eurocities.

Honorary Citizens

The following is a list of honorary citizens of the city:
 Józef Piłsudski – 1921
 Marian Zyndram-Kościałkowski – 1934
 Alfons Karny – 1975
 Lech Wałęsa – 1990
 Ryszard Kaczorowski – 1990
 Sławoj Leszek Głódź – 1995
 John Paul II – 1996
 Stanisław Szymecki – 1998
 Henryk Gulbinowicz – 2000
 Jerzy Maksymiuk – 2000
 Zdzisław Peszkowski – 2005
 Wojciech Ziemba – 2006
 Calherine Stankiewicz von Ernst – 2006
 Louis-Christophe Zaleski-Zamenhof – 2007

Podlaskie Voivodeship Governance

Białystok is the capital of Podlaskie Voivodeship, the Voivodeship Office is located on Mickiewicz Street.

National and EU Representation

Several members of both houses of the Polish Parliament (Sejm and Senat) are elected from the Białystok constituency. Białystok is represented by the Podlaskie and Warmian-Masurian constituency of the European Parliament. The current MEPs  are Krzysztof Lisek and Jacek Kurski.

International relations
Belarus has a Consulate General in Białystok.
Romania has an Honorary Consulate in Białystok.

References

City councils in Poland
Cities and towns in Podlaskie Voivodeship
City counties of Poland